The Ewaso Nyiro barb (Enteromius mimus) is a species of ray-finned fish in the  family Cyprinidae.

Its natural habitat is rivers, and it is found only in Kenya, where its namesame river flows.

It is not considered a threatened species by the IUCN.

References

Enteromius
Endemic freshwater fish of Kenya
Fish described in 1912
Taxa named by George Albert Boulenger
Taxonomy articles created by Polbot